Martin Scott Nessley (born February 16, 1965) is a retired American professional basketball player who had a brief career in the NBA during the 1987–88 season. He was a 7'2", 260 lb center.

Nessley played college basketball at Duke University from 1983 to 1987 and was selected with the second pick in the sixth round of the 1987 NBA Draft by the Los Angeles Clippers. He spent the following season with the Clippers and the Sacramento Kings, scoring 48 points in 44 games.

References

External links
 
 

1965 births
Living people
American men's basketball players
Basketball players from Columbus, Ohio
Centers (basketball)
Columbus Horizon players
Duke Blue Devils men's basketball players
Los Angeles Clippers draft picks
Los Angeles Clippers players
McDonald's High School All-Americans
Parade High School All-Americans (boys' basketball)
Power forwards (basketball)
Rockford Lightning players
Sacramento Kings players
Wichita Falls Texans players